The Texas International Education Consortium (TIEC) is an international, private, non-profit corporation located in Austin, Texas.  Founded in 1985, it works with 32 public universities in Texas on a variety of international projects, including founding new universities, developing university programs, creating cooperation programs between international universities, and facilitating K-12 education. 

TIEC also operates the Texas Intensive English Program (TIEP), which provides English as a second language instruction to international students. Heather Farmakis, Ph.D. is the Chief Learning Officer for the organization, she is a recognized leader in education, specializing in professional development, online learning and teaching. Dr. Farmakis pioneered the development of online programs, reaching international audiences, and founded the Online Global Community, where program alumni connect and collaborate. TIEP is the oldest running intensive English program in Texas.

References

External links
 TIEC official site

Education in Texas